RGraph is an HTML5 software library for charting written in native JavaScript. It was created in 2008. RGraph started as an easy-to-use commercial tool based on HTML5 canvas only. It became freely available to use under the open-source MIT license and supports more than 50 chart types in both SVG and canvas.

License 
RGraph is published using the Open Source MIT license.

Mentions 
In July 2014, Salesforce made RGraph available to be plugged into the reporting and dashboard tools on its mobile platform. RGraph is among six third-party visualization tools available inside the dashboards, together with Google Charts, D3.js, CanvasJS, Chart.js, and Highcharts.

In a book "Android Cookbook: Problems and Solutions for Android Developers," RGraph is recommended as an alternative to creating Android charts in pure Java.

See also 

 JavaScript framework
 JavaScript library

References

External links 
 

Data visualization software
JavaScript libraries
JavaScript visualization toolkits
JavaScript
Visualization API
Charts
Infographics
Free software programmed in JavaScript
Software using the MIT license
Free data analysis software
Formerly proprietary software